Heart of Europe: A Short History of Poland  is a book about history of Poland, written by the English historian Norman Davies. It was published by Oxford University Press in 1984. Second edition with a changed subtitle, Heart of Europe: The Past in Poland's Present, was published in 2001. The book was translated to Polish as Serce Europy. Krótka historia Polski in 1995.

It contains a series of essays by Davies about Polish history. New York Times in 1984 called it "another masterpiece", following his earlier work on Poland.

References

External links 

 Heart of Europe at Norman Davies official homepage

1984 non-fiction books
Books by Norman Davies
History books about Poland
20th-century history books
English-language books